Robert Thomas Perry (born March 11, 1943) is an American former politician. He served as a Republican member for the 24th district in the South Dakota House of Representatives from 2011 to 2012.

References

1943 births
Living people
Politicians from Iowa City, Iowa
People from Fort Pierre, South Dakota
Educators from South Dakota
Republican Party members of the South Dakota House of Representatives